The Lloydminster Meridian Booster is a newspaper based out of Lloydminster, Alberta/Saskatchewan, Canada. It is published weekly on Wednesday. It publishes a mix of community, provincial and national news and is owned by the Lloydminster Source, another newspaper based out of Lloydminster.

History 
In 1958, Byron Keebaugh founded Meridian Printing Ltd. and founded the Meridian Booster the following year in 1959. Keebaugh an early adopter of offset printing, introduced the technology to Lloydminster at a time when it was generally only used in larger newspaper markets like Edmonton and Calgary.
The Booster was later sold to Sun Media.
Following the founding of the Booster, Keebaugh also came to own numerous community newspapers including The Vermilion Standard, The Meadow Lake Progress, and the Bonnyville Nouvelle.
In December 2016, Postmedia, the successor to Sun Media, sold the newspaper to the Lloydminster Source.

See also 
List of newspapers in Canada
Alberta Weekly Newspapers Association
Saskatchewan Weekly Newspapers Association

References

External links 

Mass media in Lloydminster
Newspapers established in 1959
Weekly newspapers published in Alberta
Weekly newspapers published in Saskatchewan
1959 establishments in Alberta
1959 establishments in Saskatchewan